Diego Stramaccioni (born 2 January 2001) is an Italian professional footballer who plays as defender for  club Juventus Next Gen.

Club career

Early career 
Stramaccioni is a youth product of Perugia. He played 20 league games for Serie D side Cannara in the 2019–20 season. In the summer of 2020, he moved to Vis Pesaro. Stramaccioni made his Serie C debut on 26 September in a 2–2 draw against Legnago.

Juventus 
On 2 October 2020, Juventus bought Stramaccioni and loaned him back to Vis Pesaro. Stramaccioni made 30 appearances and one goal for Vis Pesaro during the 2020–21 season. In summer 2021, Stramaccioni returned to Juventus and made his unofficial debut for them in a pre-season friendly on 24 July, coming as 74th-minute substitute in a 3–1 win against Cesena. On 12 September, Stramaccioni debutted for Juventus U23 in a 1–0 defeat against Pro Patria. On 1 March 2022, Stramaccioni was first called up from the first team for a Coppa Italia match against Fiorentina.

Career statistics

External links

Notelist

References 

2001 births
Living people
People from Assisi
Footballers from Umbria
Italian footballers
Association football defenders
A.C. Perugia Calcio players
Vis Pesaro dal 1898 players
Juventus F.C. players
Juventus Next Gen players
Serie D players
Serie C players
Sportspeople from the Province of Perugia